Higher is the fifth album, and the fourth studio album, by Ezio, released in 2000. Produced by Peter Van Hooke, the record also features contributions from Paul Carrack and Rod Argent.

Track listing

All songs written by Ezio Lunedei except Sweet Thing, written by Van Morrison.

"Still ice cold" – 4:32
"At that moment" – 7:00
"You're strange" – 3:38
"Perfect" – 4:00
"Higher"  - 4:50
"Meet me in the Gods" – 6:17
"Oranges" – 4:57
"Anymore" – 4:41
"Freedom" – 5:15
"Sometimes silence" – 4:57

See also
2000 in music

References

2000 albums
Ezio (band) albums